Williams–Brown House and Store is a historic home and general store located at Salem, Virginia. It was built about 1837, and is a -story, "L"-shaped brick building with Greek Revival and Federal style design influences.  It features a double porch with chamfered edges ending in lambs' tongues.

The house is occupied by the Salem Museum and Historical Society.

It was added to the National Register of Historic Places in 1971.

References

External links
Salem Museum and Historical Society website

Houses on the National Register of Historic Places in Virginia
Greek Revival houses in Virginia
Federal architecture in Virginia
Houses completed in 1837
Houses in Salem, Virginia
National Register of Historic Places in Salem, Virginia
Historic American Buildings Survey in Virginia
History museums in Virginia